Isle aux Morts is a small town on the Southwest Coast of the Island of Newfoundland, with a population of 559 (2021).

There are two walking trails: Harvey Trail, named after George Harvey and his family (information below), and Boat Cove Trail, named for Boat Cove Pond, where residents obtained drinking water years ago. These two trails offer a great view of the harbour and the town. The Walters House museum, which is in an old-style house which shows what life was like in the past in Isle aux Morts. The house acted as the first school and church in Isle aux Morts.

Currently, the town contains one convenience store, a local bar and a school housing students from kindergarten to grade 9.  During the summer season there is a museum and local cafe open. In the larger and nearby town of Port aux Basques, there are several other facilities that residents can avail of, including grocery stores, shopping malls, restaurants, a state of the art sports complex and numerous other services.

In the summer, usually late July, there is a week long festival, Ann Harvey Days commemorating Ann Harvey and her family for their brave and daring rescues of sailors stranded on sinking ships, on two occasions. (more information below)

History 
Isle aux Morts has a rich Atlantic heritage and popular coastal scenery.  The community was first settled as a fishing port on nearby islands.  In the 1800s, the families moved from the islands to land and settled in what is now present day Isle aux Morts.

In 1868, the first school was built and was also used as a chapel for church services. Today it is the "Walters House Museum." The local orange lodge was constructed in 1914 with free labor by a group of men who previously used the school for their meetings.

The first fishery products plant was constructed in 1939 and burned down in 1943.  Another was built and became the heart of the community for the next fifty years.

LeGallais Memorial, was built in 1958 and served as a grade school until 1989 when the new LeGallais Memorial school was open.  In the early 2000s the highschool students from this school began being bused to neighboring Port aux Basques due to declining enrolment.

The town is mentioned in the lyrics to the Tragically Hip song "The Dire Wolf" on their In Violet Light album.

Name origin 

The town is named after a formerly inhabited nearby island and is a reference to the many shipwrecks off the coast. Isle aux Morts translates from old French as "Island of the Dead".

Archeology 
On November 26, 1981, Wayne Mushrow discovered a very rare and working Portuguese mariner's astrolabe on a shipwreck near Isle aux Morts. The year "1628" and "Y. Dyas" are stamped on the astrolabe, indicating that it was likely made by known astrolabe maker Joas Dyas. Portuguese mariner's astrolabes are unique because they are graduated for zenith distance only.

In 1983, at the same site, Mushrow found a French mariner's astrolabe stamped with the year "1617" and the name "Adrian Holland". It is unknown whether he was the maker or owner of the astrolabe. In 2001, the Mushrow Astrolabes were designated heritage treasures by the provincial government and placed in the collection of the Provincial Museum of Newfoundland and Labrador.

Demographics 

Sports and recreation 
The vast country and barren landscape make snowmobile and ATV use very popular.

Each February there is a Winter Classic Pond Hockey Tournament on a pond in the community where locals and ex-pats join to break up the long cold winter.

Economy 
In the 1970s and 1980s this town, like many others in Newfoundland thrived on the fishing industry and the peak population in the 1980s was near 1200. Since the cod moratorium in the 1990s, the town has struggled and lost near half of its permanent residents because of the closing of the fish plant and many secondary sources of work.

Most locals that live in the community commute on a rotational basis for work elsewhere in Newfoundland or Canada.

The economy relies heavily on the tourism industry in the summer months.  Tourism has grown in recent years with the successful promotion of the annual Ann Harvey Days Festival, the Isle aux Morts Theatre Festival as well as the development and beautification of the local Harvey's Trail.  In neighboring communities guided fishing trips and boat tours to nearby resettled ghost towns are available in the summer months.

Notable persons of community 
The town is most famously noted for George Harvey, his  daughter Ann Harvey, her  brother and their dog, Hairy Man.  They are known because of their bravery in rescuing sailors from two sinking ships, the Despatch and The Rankin.

A chamber opera based on the story of Ann Harvey entitled "Ann & Seamus" was written for Shallaway - Newfoundland and Labrador Youth in Chorus by Stephen Hatfield in 2007.  The opera was based on the narrative poem by Kevin Major.

See also
 List of cities and towns in Newfoundland and Labrador
 List of people of Newfoundland and Labrador
 Channel-Port aux Basques, Newfoundland and Labrador
 Newfoundland outport

References

External links
Province receives heritage treasures
Identifying The Astrolabe
The Mushrow Astrolabe
Ann & Seamus - A Chamber Opera Official Site
Exploring Newfoundland and Labrador
Isle aux Morts - Encyclopedia of Newfoundland and Labrador, vol. 3, p. 82-83.

Populated coastal places in Canada
Towns in Newfoundland and Labrador